The 2019 JSM Challenger of Champaign–Urbana was a professional tennis tournament played on hard courts. It was the twenty-fourth edition of the tournament which was part of the 2019 ATP Challenger Tour. It took place in Champaign, Illinois, United States between November 11 and November 17, 2019.

Singles main-draw entrants

Seeds

 1 Rankings are as of November 4, 2019.

Other entrants
The following players received wildcards into the singles main draw:
  Alexander Brown
  Aleksandar Kovacevic
  Austin Rapp
  Keegan Smith
  Zachary Svajda

The following players received entry from the qualifying draw:
  William Blumberg
  Ezekiel Clark

Champions

Singles

 J. J. Wolf def.  Sebastian Korda 6–4, 6–7(3–7), 7–6(8–6).

Doubles

 Christopher Eubanks /  Kevin King def.  Evan Hoyt /  Martin Redlicki 7–5, 6–3.

References

2019 ATP Challenger Tour
2019
Champaign
2019 in sports in Illinois
November 2019 sports events in the United States